Justice Kidwell may refer to:

 Homer Baird Kidwell, associate justice of the Supreme Court of Hawaii
 Wayne L. Kidwell, associate justice of the Idaho Supreme Court